The 18th Vanier Cup was played on November 20, 1982, at Varsity Stadium in Toronto, Ontario, and decided the CIAU football champion for the 1982 season. The UBC Thunderbirds won their first ever championship by defeating the Western Mustangs by a score of 39-14.

References

External links
 Official website

Vanier Cup
Vanier Cup
Vanier Cup
Vanier Cup